Connie Spenuzza (born September 29, 1953) is an American author who lives in Dana Point, California also known under her pen name Cecilia Velástegui, she has been collected by libraries.

Early life and education
Spenuzza was born in Quito, Ecuador. She graduated from University of Southern California with a master's degree in 1977.

Career

Her first novel, Gathering the Indigo Maidens (2011), was a finalist for the Mariposa Prize. Her second novel, Traces of Bliss (2012), was selected to the National Latino Book Club by the Association of American Publishers and the Las Comadres international organization. Her third novel, Missing in Machu Picchu (2013), was awarded first place in adventure fiction by the International Latino Book Awards, but was given an unfavorable review by Publishers Weekly.

In 2014 her novel Parisian Promises received a positive review from US Review of Books.

Spenuzza has been invited as an author panelist at Literary Orange, the Los Angeles Times Festival of Books, the Big Orange Book, and the Los Angeles Zoo.

Spenuzza also writes children’s bilingual fables. Olinguito Speaks Up-Olinguito alza la voz (2013) received first place for Best Latino Focused Children’s Picture Book by the 2014 International Latino Book Awards.

In 2018 her novel Lucia Zarate: the Odyssey of the World’s Smallest Woman (2017) received first place in fiction from the San Francisco Book Festival. This novel was selected as a 2017 FOREWORD Indies Book Finalist in multicultural fiction.

In 2019, Jubilant Journeys received 2nd Place in Most Inspirational category of the International Latino Book Awards. The first place went to José Andrés, a Nobel Peace Prize nominee and a James Beard Humanitarian Award Winner.

Books

 Velástegui, Cecilia (2011). Gathering the Indigo Maidens. Libros Pub. .
 Velástegui, Cecilia (2012). Traces of Bliss. Libros Pub. .
 Velástegui, Cecilia (2013). Missing in Machu Picchu. Libros Pub. .
 Velástegui, Cecilia (2013). Olinguito Speaks Up. Libros Publishing LLC. .
 Velástegui, Cecilia (2014). Lalo Loves to Help. Libros Publishing Llc. .
 Velástegui, Cecilia (2015). Parisian Promises. Libros Publishing Llc. .
 Velástegui, Cecilia (2017). Lucia Zarate: The Odyssey of the World’s Smallest Woman. Libros Publishing Llc. .
 Spenuzza, Connie (2019). Jubilant Journeys: Experience the Wanderlust Serendipity of a Fifty-Year Journey Across 125 Countries. Libros Publishing. 
Spenuzza, Connie (29 September 2021). Spanish Colonial Paintings Paired with Engraved Sources. Libros Publishing. .
Spenuzza, Connie (14 February 2022). Chocolate Runs Through My Veins: The Insightful History of the Women of Chocolate. Libros Publishing. .

References

External links
 
 Interview: Cecilia Velástegui, Author of 'Parisian Promises', Seattle Post-Intelligencer

Living people
Writers from California
1953 births
American women novelists
University of Southern California alumni
21st-century American women